Ulla Sjöblom (11 May 1927 – 3 August 1989) was a Swedish film actress. She appeared in 50 films between 1952 and 1988.

Selected filmography
 House of Women (1953)
 Karin Månsdotter (1954)
 Simon the Sinner (1954)
 Our Father and the Gypsy (1954)
 The People of Hemsö (1955)
 Wild Birds (1955)
 My Passionate Longing (1956)
 The Magician (1958)
 The Bookseller Gave Up Bathing (1969)
 Rötmånad (1970)
 Gangsterfilmen (1974)
 Flight of the Eagle (1982)
 Åke and His World (1984)

External links

 

1927 births
1989 deaths
Swedish film actresses
Actresses from Stockholm
Eugene O'Neill Award winners
20th-century Swedish actresses